Un siècle d'écrivains ("a century of writers") was a French series of television documentary films aired on France 3 between 1995 and 2001. A total of 257 documentaries were made, each focusing on a writer active during the 20th century. The series was initiated by France 3's program director Jean-Pierre Cottet in the spring of 1994. Each episode was independently produced by different production companies and directors, restricted to a running time of 52 minutes. The episodes were presented by Bernard Rapp. The series ended with a special episode about Antoine Chuquet, an imaginary writer made up by the producers.

List of episodes
This list is incomplete. It is ordered alphabetically after the author portrayed.

Alain-Fournier by Jacques Tréfouël (1995)
Jorge Amado by Henri Raillard (1995)
Guillaume Apollinaire by Jean-Claude Bringuier (1998)
Antonin Artaud by André S. Labarthe (2000) 
Audiberti, des tonnes de semences by Philippe Condroyer (1998)
Marcel Aymé by Sylvain Roumette (1996)  
Maurice Barrès by Jean-Claude Lamy and Claude Vajda (1995) 
Hervé Bazin by Jean-Daniel Verhaeghe and Pierre Moustiers (1996)
Simone de Beauvoir by Valérie Stroh and Pascale Fautrier (1999)
Georges Bernanos by Patrick Zeyen (1995) 
Karen Blixen by Jean-Noël Cristiani (1995)
Antoine Blondin by Jean-François Gire (1995)
Borges, l'homme miroir by Alberto Manguel and Philippe Molins (1999) 
Henri Bosco by Jean-François Jung (2000)
Mikhaïl Afanassievitch Boulgakov by Iossif Pasternak (1997)
Emmanuel Bove by Hervé Duhamel (1996)
René Guy Cadou (commentary by Jean Rouaud)
Albert Camus by Calmette Joël and Jean-Daniel Verhaeghe (1999)
Roger Caillois by Nicolas Stern and Dominique Rabourdin (1999) 
Italo Calvino by Edgardo Cozarinsky (1995)
Alejo Carpentier : Ici et là-bas by Emilio Pacull (1997)
Constantin Cavafis by Elgal Erera (1998)
Jean Cayrol, Lazare parmi nous by Jean-Luc Alpigiano and Jacques Loiseleux (2000)
Louis-Ferdinand Céline, un diamant noir comme l'enfer by Emmanuel Descombes and Alain Moreau (1998)
Blaise Cendrars by Claude-Pierre Cahvanon
Jacques Chardonne by Marie-Dominique Montel (2000)
Andrée Chedid by Antoine Léonard and Vicky Sommet (1998)
Agatha Christie maîtresse du mystère by Jérôme de Missolz (1995)
Antoine Chuquet by Alain Wieder (2001)
Cioran by Bernard Jourdain and Patrice Bollon (1999)
Bernard Clavel by Claude Vajda (1999)
Albert Cohen by Glenio Bonder and William Karel (1995) 
Colette by Jacques Tréfouël (1995)
Arthur Conan Doyle by Marie-Dominique Montel (1997) 
Julio Cortázar by Chantal Rémy (1997) 
Michel Déon by Pierre Dupouey (1995)
John Dos Passos by Daniel Costelle (1995)
James Ellroy by Benoît Cohen and François Guérif (1999)
Paul Éluard by Isabelle Clarke and Daniel Costelle (1995)
William Faulkner by Marc Jampolsky and Michel Abescat (1995)
Carlos Fuentes by Valeria Sarmiento and Guy Scarpetta (1998)
Anatole France by François Chaye and Olivier Barrot (1995)
Romain Gary by Olivier Mille and André Asséo (1999) 
Jean Genet by Michel Van Zele (1995)
Michel de Ghelderode, l'Archange by Patrick Zeyen (1999) 
Jean Giono by Claude Santelli (1995)
Jean Giraudoux by Philippe Piazza and Marcel Jullian (1995)
Édouard Glissant by Patrick Chamoiseau, Claude Chonville and Guy Deslauriers (1996) 
Nadine Gordimer
Julien Gracq by Michel Mitrani (1995)
Graham Greene by Marie-Dominique Montel (1995)
Louis Guilloux by Josiane Maisse (1996) 
Sacha Guitry by Marcel Jullian and Philippe Piazza (1995)
Patricia Highsmith by Philippe Kohly (1995)
Chester Himes en noir et blanc by Michel Lebrun and Godwin Djadja (1995)  
Bohumil Hrabal by Patrick Cazals (1995) 
Les Derniers jours d'Aldous Huxley by Béatrice Limare (1999)
Eugène Ionesco (1909 - 1994) by Philippe Truffault (2000)
Max Jacob by Alain Ferrari (1995)

Alfred Jarry by Jean-Christophe Averty (1995)
Pierre Jean Jouve by Olivier Mille and Robert Kopp
James Joyce by Antoine Gallien (1995)
Ernst Jünger by Gero von Boehm (1996) 
Kafka by Karel Procop (1995) 
Kipling ou le syndrome de Lahore (1865 - 1936) by Francis Guillery (1999)
Giuseppe Tomasi di Lampedusa by Dominique Gros and Jean-Claude Navarro (1997)
Valery Larbaud by François Chayé (1995)
Thomas Edward Lawrence by Marie-Dominique Montel (1996)
Paul Léautaud by Patrick Zeyen (1997)
Michel Leiris ou l'homme sans honneur by Christophe Barreyre (1995)
Gaston Leroux by Jean-François Jung (1995)
Primo Levi
Jack London, enfant rebelle du rêve californien by Michel Viotte (1995)
Toute marche mystérieuse vers un destin, le cas Lovecraft by Pierre Trividic, Patrick Mario Bernard and Anne-Louise Trividic (1998)
Carson McCullers by Fabrice Cazeneuve (1995)
Vladimir Maiakovski
Curzio Malaparte by Jean-Paul Fargier (1998)
François Mauriac by Olivier Guiton and Jérôme Prieur (1995)
Henri Michaux by Alain Jaubert (1995) 
Yukio Mishima by Jean-Claude Lubtchansky (1995)
Alberto Moravia, l'homme qui regarde by Nico Di Biase (1998)
Henry Miller by Robert Mugnerot (1995)
Patrick Modiano by Paule Zajdermann and Antoine de Gaudemar (1996)
Robert Musil by Alain Jaubert (1996)  
Pablo Neruda by Amalia Escriva (1998)
Jean Paulhan, le don d'ubiquité by Jérôme Prieur (1998)
Cesare Pavese by Alain Bergala (1995)
Charles Péguy by Jean-Paul Fargier (1995)
Georges Perros by Jérôme Garcin and Paul André Picton (1999)
Jacques Prévert le cancre magnifique by Gilles Nadeau (1995)
Fernando Pessoa le voyageur immobile by Isabel Calpe (1995)
Marcel Proust by Pierre Dumayet (1995)
André Pieyre de Mandiargues, l'amateur d'imprudence by Evelyne Clavaud (2000)
Raymond Queneau by Robert Bobert (1995)
Les Deux vies du chat Radiguet by Jean-Christophe Averty and Pierre Trividic (2000)
Alain Robbe Grillet by Frédéric Compain (1999)
Salman Rushdie by Elisa Mantin (1999)
Ernesto Sábato by Gonzalo Arijon (1995)
Françoise Sagan by Mona Makki and Dominique Gallet (1996)
Antoine de Saint-Exupéry by Jacques Tréfouël (1996)
Jérôme David Salinger by Benoît Jacquot (1996)
Jean-Paul Sartre l'écriture by Dominique Masson (1995)
Nathalie Sarraute by Jacques Doillon (1995)
Leonardo Sciascia, une vérité née en Sicile by Françoise Gallo (1995)
Victor Segalen un poète aventurier dans l'empire du ciel by Olivier Horn (1995)
David Shahar by Elgal Erera (1999)
Georges Simenon by Francis Lacassin (1997)
Alexandre Soljenitsyne by Françoise Wolff and Michel Parfenoff (1999)
Philippe Soupault by Antoine Gallien (2000)
Portrait incomplet de Gertrude Stein by Arnaud des Pallières (1999)
John Steinbeck ou l'esprit des lieux by Alain Gallet and Michel Le Bris (1995)
André Suarès, l'insurgé by Françoise Gallo and Robert Parienté (1998)
Rabindranath Tagore by Sylvain Roumette (1995)
Paul Valéry by Pierre Dumayet and Robert Bober (1997)
Marguerite Yourcenar by Dominique Gros (1995)
Lu Xun by Henry Lange (1999)

References

External links
 Official website (via Internet Archive) 

1995 French television series debuts
2001 French television series endings
Documentary films about writers
French documentary television series